WSTRN (a disemvoweling of the word Western, which is also pronounced) are a British afroswing collective from West London consisting of Akelle Charles, Haile (born Ras Haile Alexander), and Louis Rei (born Louis-Rae Beadle). Their debut single, "In2", was released on 20 July 2015, and peaked at number 4 on the UK Singles Chart. Louis Rei was formerly known as LB, Akelle was formerly known as A-Star and is Haile's cousin. Haile has featured on several tracks as a solo artist, including "Can't Blame Me" by Nines.

Background
WSTRN consists of Akelle Charles, Haile and Louis Rei. The name bears no relevance to westerns; according to the band, the name represents positive vibrations and to them means that it is "West London's turn to shut down the scene". Akelle and Haile are cousins who know Louis, a former footballer who last played for Staines Town F.C., through their inhabitance of West London, while Akelle is the brother of singer Angel and was part of a band with him and his three other siblings called the Charles Family, co-managed by the late reggae singer Smiley Culture and Akelle's father, Tendai Charles, who was in the same reggae group as Haile's father. Rei's father is Gary Beadle. The group failed to achieve mainstream success despite being the subject of a BBC documentary One Life. Akelle Charles had two main followers, which were his nephews, who encouraged him to keep producing songs as well as the will to be signed.

Career

2015–present: Formation and "In2"
Their debut single, "In2", was released on 20 July 2015, through Link Up TV and came together as a result of a jam session, instrumental first; Akelle and Haile had written a track and had asked Louis to feature on it. It was recorded in one of the group's first sessions and has appeared on the Radio 1Xtra and Kiss FM playlists. Two music videos were produced for the song – the first was pulled after the band signed to Atlantic Records, while the second was produced by Sally Sibbet and sees the group loitering across West London. Prior to the release of the latter video, Atlantic Records pulled down 43 unofficial YouTube and SoundCloud links before its submission.

On 30 October, "In2" debuted at number 85 in the top 100 of the UK Singles Chart, and climbed to number 60 on 6 November, the day of its digital download release. For these two weeks, it charted on streams alone. Upon its digital release, it peaked at number 4 on 13 November 2015, earning the group its first top 40 and general chart entry.

On 2 December 2015, the trio released the song "Got Love", produced by Parallel (a collective made up of Akelle's brother, Angel, and PRGRSHN). The song was available to download for free when subscribing to their mailing list, and was also released via digital retailers on 4 December. The group expressed via Twitter that the song was not a single. According to Clash Music, the song is about "appreciating the simple things in life".

In July 2017 it was reported that Akelle had been incarcerated for four and a half years for violent disorder.

Discography

Mixtapes

Singles

As lead artist

As featured artist

Promotional singles

Remixes

Notes

References

External links
 
 

English hip hop groups
British contemporary R&B musical groups
Black British musical groups
Musical groups established in 2015
Musical groups from London
British musical trios
2015 establishments in England